Daniel, Danny or Dan O'Sullivan may refer to:

Daniel O'Sullivan (musician) (born 1980), English musician
Danny O'Sullivan (Australian rules footballer) (born 1952)
Danny O'Sullivan (boxer) (1923–1990), English boxer
Dan O'Sullivan (basketball) (born 1968), American basketball player
Dan O'Sullivan (Gaelic footballer) (1927–2013), Irish Gaelic footballer
Dan O'Sullivan (historian), British author of Wikipedia – A New Community of Practice?